Aleksander Ivanovich Kazarsky, (June 16, 1797 – June 16, 1833) was a Russian Navy officer, the hero of the Russo-Turkish War (1828–1829). Kazarsky was the captain of brig Mercury and became famous after the victory in the battle against two Turkish ships of the line.

Career 

 Kazarsky joined the fleet in 1811.
 In 1814 he became an officer.
 In 1829 as a Captain Lieutenant he was the captain of 18-gun brig Mercury.
 On 14 May 1829 Mercury under the command of Kazarsky won the battle against two Turkish ships of the line.
 From 26 May to 17 July 1829 Kasarsky was the captain of frigate Pospeshny.
 From 1831 to 1833 Kazarsky was a member of the retinue of Nicholas I of Russia.
 In 1833 he was poisoned.

A brig, a torpedo boat and a street in Sevastopol were named after Alexander Kazarsky.

19th-century military personnel from the Russian Empire
1797 births
1833 deaths
Imperial Russian Navy personnel